Belciana biformis is a moth of the family Noctuidae first described by Francis Walker in 1858.

Distribution
It is found in India, Sri Lanka, Andaman Islands, Nicobar Islands, Malaysia, Borneo, Thailand, Vietnam, Philippines, Sumatra, Java, and Papua New Guinea.

Biology
The species' wingspan is 37–43 mm. Its head, thorax and forewings are bluish green. The wing pattern is formed by a blackish-brown subbasal patch, occupying subbasal field to vein copper colored. Blackish marks are found on the costal area in the base of the submedial, medial and submedial lines. Submedial and subterminal lines are marked as thin lines, sometimes with blackish dots. They are more clearly visible in females, whereas they are diffused or indistinct in males. Reniform hardly traceable, without black central streak. Hindwings are dull medium greyish brown, with a paler yellowish grey towards base and along anal margin.

Its caterpillars are known to feed on Shorea maximi, Grewia tiliaefolia and Heritiera species.

References

External links
Ribosomal protein S5

Moths of Asia
Moths described in 1858